= Khanzadipur =

Coordinates: 25°06′N 82°56′E

- village
- Interactive map of Khanzadipur
- Country: India
- State: Uttar Pradesh

Government
  - Body: Gram panchayat

Languages
  - Official: Hindi
- Time zone: UTC+5:30 (IST)

Khanzadipur is a small village located 42 km from the city of Varanasi in Uttar Pradesh, India.

== Geography and people ==
Village area is 203 hq and the population is 732 (384 males, 348 females). Although it is a small village, it is home to a diverse group of local residents comprising farmers, artisans, weavers, teachers, truck drivers, professors, retired government and private sector employees and many others. Entertainment options are quite limited in the village as there are no movie theaters and village folks cannot depend on television because electricity is a huge problem.
